Research on the health and safety hazards of 3D printing is new and in development due to the recent proliferation of 3D printing devices. In 2017, the European Agency for Safety and Health at Work has published a discussion paper on the processes and materials involved in 3D printing, potential implications of this technology for occupational safety and health and avenues for controlling potential hazards.

Hazards

Emissions 
Emissions from fused filament printers can include a large number of ultrafine particles and volatile organic compounds (VOCs). The toxicity from emissions varies by source material due to differences in size, chemical properties, and quantity of emitted particles. Excessive exposure to VOCs can lead to irritation of the eyes, nose, and throat, headache, loss of coordination, and nausea and some of the chemical emissions of fused filament printers have also been linked to asthma. Based on animal studies, carbon nanotubes and carbon nanofibers sometimes used in fused filament printing can cause pulmonary effects including inflammation, granulomas, and pulmonary fibrosis when at the nanoparticle size. A National Institute for Occupational Safety and Health (NIOSH) study noted particle emissions from a fused filament peaked a few minutes after printing started and returned to baseline levels 100 minutes after printing ended. Workers may also inadvertently transport materials outside the workplace on their shoes, garments, and body, which may pose hazards for other members of the public.

Laser sintering and laser beam melting systems for additive manufacturing have become more important recently. The Institute for Occupational Safety and Health (IFA) together with German social accident insurance institutions conducted a measurement programme on inhalation exposure to hazardous substances during laser deposition welding and laser beam melting with alloyed steels and nickel-, aluminium- and titanium-based alloys. No chromium(VI) compounds were detected in the workplace air during the process when materials containing chromium were processed, and the assessment criteria were complied with during processes with the other metal powders. One reason for this is that the machines are usually operated with encapsulation or dust extraction in order to achieve the required product quality. Since many work steps before and after the process including the handling of powder or powdered parts are performed manually or semi-automatically, there are huge effects on the degree of inhalation exposure and the measured values vary broadly. It is therefore difficult to derive tailored measures for these processes.

Carbon nanoparticle emissions and processes using powder metals are highly combustible and raise the risk of dust explosions. At least one case of severe injury was noted from an explosion involved in metal powders used for fused filament printing.

Other 
Additional hazards include burns from hot surfaces such as lamps and print head blocks, exposure to laser or ultraviolet radiation, electrical shock, mechanical injury from being struck by moving parts, and noise and ergonomic hazards. Other concerns involve gas and material exposures, in particular nanomaterials, material handling, static electricity, moving parts and pressures.

Hazards to health and safety also exist from post-processing activities done to finish parts after they have been printed. These post-processing activities can include chemical baths, sanding, polishing, or vapor exposure to refine surface finish, as well as general subtractive manufacturing techniques such as drilling, milling, or turning to modify the printed geometry. Any technique that removes material from the printed part has the potential to generate particles that can be inhaled or cause eye injury if proper personal protective equipment is not used, such as respirators or safety glasses. Caustic baths are often used to dissolve support material used by some 3D printers that allows them to print more complex shapes. These baths require personal protective equipment to prevent injury to exposed skin.

Since 3D imaging creates items by fusing materials together, there runs the risk of layer separation in some devices made using 3D imaging. For example, in January 2013, the US medical device company, DePuy, recalled their knee and hip replacement systems. The devices were made from layers of metal, and shavings had come loose – potentially harming the patient.

Hazard controls 

Hazard controls include using manufacturer-supplied covers and full enclosures, using proper ventilation, keeping workers away from the printer, using respirators, turning off the printer if it jammed, and using lower emission printers and filaments. Personal protective equipment has been found to be the least desirable control method with a recommendation that it only be used to add further protection in combination with approved emissions protection.

Health regulation 
Although no occupational exposure limits specific to 3D printer emissions exist, certain source materials used in 3D printing, such as carbon nanofiber and carbon nanotubes, have established occupational exposure limits at the nanoparticle size.

 the US Government has set 3D printer emission standards for only a limited number of compounds. Furthermore, the few established standards address factory conditions, not home or other environments in which the printers are likely to be used.

References

3D printing
Occupational hazards